Eric Hales (1901–1993) was a British actor.

Selected filmography
 The Second Mate (1928)
 The Lure of the Atlantic (1929)
 Chelsea Life (1933)
 Anne One Hundred (1933)
 The Secret of the Loch (1934)
 Lucky Days (1935)
 Blue Smoke (1935)
 The Last Curtain (1937)
 There Was a Young Man (1937)
 Double Alibi (1937)
 Strange Experiment (1937)
 Cross My Heart (1937)
 Under the Red Robe (1937)
 Contraband (1940)

References

External links

1901 births
1993 deaths
British male film actors
20th-century British male actors
Date of birth missing
Place of birth missing
Date of death missing
Place of death missing